Margaret Thatcher was Prime Minister of the United Kingdom from 1979 to 1990. Her portrayal in the arts and popular culture has been mixed. In the words of one critic she attracted "musical opprobrium like no other British political leader". Such opinion is divergent from mainstream opinion polling which tends to place her as the most popular British prime minister since Winston Churchill.

Arts critic Michael Billington noted that "Thatcher may not have cared passionately about the arts, but she left her emphatic mark upon them."

This page is a list of depictions of Thatcher on stage, in film, TV, radio, literature, music and in other forms of the arts and entertainment.

Film
 Reagan (2023) – Lesley-Anne Down
 The Iron Lady (2011) – Meryl Streep
 In Search of La Che (2011) – Steve Nallon
 Back in Business (2007) – Caroline Bernstein
 I Am Bob (2007) – Caroline Bernstein
 For Your Eyes Only (1981) – Janet Brown

Television drama
 The Crown (2020) – Gillian Anderson
 When Harvey Met Bob (2010) – Ingrid Craigie
 The Queen (2009) – Lesley Manville
 Margaret (2009) – Lindsay Duncan
 The Long Walk to Finchley (2008) – Andrea Riseborough
 Coup! (2006) – Caroline Blakiston
 The Line of Beauty (2006) – Kika Markham
 Pinochet in Suburbia (2006) – Anna Massey
 The Alan Clark Diaries (2004) – Louise Gold
 The Falklands Play (2002) – Patricia Hodge
 Deutschlandspiel (2000) (TV) – Nicole Heesters
 The Final Cut (1995) – funeral and memorial statue depicted
 Thatcher: The Final Days (1991) – Sylvia Syms
 House of Cards (1990) – began after Thatcher's resignation, following the premiership of her fictional successor Hal Collingridge and his succession by Francis Urquhart.
 About Face (1989) – Maureen Lipman
 First Among Equals (Hilary Turner) (1986) – Paola Dionisotti

Theatre
 Margaret Thatcher Queen of Soho (2013–present) – A drag comedy musical play imagining what life would have been like if Thatcher had got lost in Soho on the eve of the vote for Section 28. It was performed in December 2013 at Theatre503 in London, in August 2014 at the Edinburgh Fringe and is transferring to London once again in March 2015 at the Leicester Square Theatre.
 The Audience (2013) – played in the premiere production by Haydn Gwynne
 Handbagged (2010) – A play shown at the Tricycle Theatre in London as part of its Women, Power and Politics festival. Handbagged examined the relationship between Thatcher and the Queen. The younger Thatcher was portrayed by Claire Cox and the elder by Stella Gonet. Handbagged was later expanded by its writer Moira Buffini and presented as a full play at the Tricycle in late 2013. The director was Indhu Rubasingham.
 The Death of Margaret Thatcher (2008) – coffin is onstage throughout the play, dealing with the differing reactions of the cast towards her death
 Market Boy (2006) – Set in a marketplace in 1980s Romford, a character called "Posh Lady" is meant to resemble Thatcher. When the play debuted at the National Theatre in London, she was played by Nicola Blackwell.
 Thatcher – The Musical!
 Billy Elliot the Musical (2005) – contains the irreverent song "Merry Christmas Maggie Thatcher" by Elton John
 Little Madam – a play by James Graham, exploring the life and career of Thatcher, presented at Finborough Theatre, London
 Sink the Belgrano! (1986) – a vitriolic satirical play by Steven Berkoff, in which she is called "Maggot Scratcher"

Satire
 Neocolonialism (2013) – Thatcher is quoted in the main menu, and sometimes appears as a computer player
 The Hunt for Tony Blair (2011) – Jennifer Saunders
 Jeffrey Archer: The Truth (2002) – Greta Scacchi
 The Comic Strip Presents... (1990, 1992) – Jennifer Saunders
 Dunrulin (1990) – Angela Thorne
 KYTV (1989) – Steve Nallon
 The True Confessions of Adrian Albert Mole – character Margaret Hilda Roberts, created as a satire by writer Sue Townsend
 Doctor Who: "The Happiness Patrol" (1988) – character of Helen A is a caricature of Thatcher
 The New Statesman (1987–90) – Steve Nallon
 Spitting Image (1984–96) – voiced by Steve Nallon; caricatured as a "fascist hermaphrodite: wearing power suits, using urinals and smoking cigars"
 Yes Minister (1984) – herself (a short sketch, on 20 January 1984, at an award ceremony for the writers, commemorated on a Private Eye cover)
Are You Being Served? (1983) – In the episode "Monkey Business," a scene is set inside Number 10 with Thatcher appearing offscreen (only her hand is seen and her voice heard, portrayed by actress Jan Ravens) interacting with John Inman's character Mr Humphries
 Anyone for Denis? (1982) – Angela Thorne
 The Iron Lady (1979)  – Janet Brown (satirical album written by John Wells of Private Eye)
 Saturday Night Live (1979, 1982, 1988, 2013) – Michael Palin; Mary Gross; John Lithgow; Fred Armisen, Taran Killam, Bill Hader, Jason Sudeikis, as Ian Rubbish and the Bizzaros
 RuPaul's Drag Race UK (2019) – Drag Queen Baga Chipz appeared as Thatcher during the Snatch Game challenge of the first series of RuPaul's Drag Race UK. Chipz later resumed the role alongside fellow RuPaul's Drag Race UK contestant The Vivienne as Donald Trump in Morning T&T on WOW Presents Plus.

Literature
 The Line of Beauty by Alan Hollinghurst (2004)
 Alan Clark Diaries: Volume 2: Into Politics 1972–1982 by Alan Clark (2000)
 Icon by Frederick Forsyth (1997)
 A Heart So White by Javier Marías (1995) – The hero of the novel is an interpreter at a long conversation between Thatcher and a Spanish politician. Thatcher refers to the play Macbeth, from which the novel's title derives.
 The Fist of God by Frederick Forsyth (1994)
 Alan Clark Diaries: Volume 1: In Power 1983–1992 by Alan Clark (1993)
 A Little Bit of Sunshine by Frederick Forsyth (1991)
 The Negotiator by Frederick Forsyth (1989)
 The Fourth Protocol by Frederick Forsyth (1984)
 First Among Equals by Jeffrey Archer (1984)
 The Devil's Alternative by Frederick Forsyth (1979), in which the character of British Prime Minister Joan Carpenter is based on Thatcher
 Miracleman: Olympus by Alan Moore and John Totleben (1989) – Thatcher is present as Miracleman explains that he and his companions will be restructuring the world economy; when she says that she could never allow this, he says "'Allow'?", and she is intimidated into silence.
 The Assassination of Margaret Thatcher – August 6, 1983 (2014) – a short story by Hilary Mantel
 The Iron Bird by Robert Woodshaw – a novel that takes the premise of Animal Farm and applies it to the life of Margaret Thatcher.

Radio
 The News Huddlines – June Whitfield
 A Family Affair – Clare Higgins

Music
While in power, Thatcher was the subject of several songs which opposed her government, including The Beat's "Stand Down Margaret", as well as a sarcastic declaration of faux adoration (Notsensibles' "I'm in Love with Margaret Thatcher"). Even after she left government, several offensive songs had been written that spitefully called for her death or looked forward to celebration of her death, including Morrissey's "Margaret on the Guillotine" ("The kind people have a wonderful dream, Margaret on the guillotine"), Elvis Costello's "Tramp the Dirt Down" ("I'll stand on your grave and tramp the dirt down"), Hefner's "The Day That Thatcher Dies" ("We will dance and sing all night") and Pete Wylie's "The Day That Margaret Thatcher Dies" ("She's gone!, And nobody cries").

Songs with Thatcher as the subject include:
 "All My Trials" by Paul McCartney
 "Margaret on the Guillotine" (song from Morrissey's album Viva Hate)
 "Stand Down Margaret" by The Beat
 "The Day That Margaret Thatcher Dies" by Pete Wylie
 "The Day That Thatcher Dies" by Hefner
 "Tramp the Dirt Down" by Elvis Costello
 "I'm There!" by Janet Brown
 "Wallflowers" by MC Frontalot
 "Margaret" by Russian band Electroforez
 "Ronnie And Mags" by NOFX
 "Miss Maggie" by Renaud
 "Madame Medusa" by UB40
 "Maggie" by The Exploited
 "Dracumag" by Ewan MacColl
 "The Grocer" by Ewan MacColl
 "I'm in love with Margaret Thatcher" by Notsensibles (one of the more sympathetic depictions of Thatcher in popular music)
 "Maggie's Farm" by The Blues Band
 "Thatcher's Fortress" by The Varukers
 "Maggie Maggie Maggie (Out Out Out)" by The Larks
 "Margaret's Injection" by Kitchens of Distinction
 "Thatcher Fucked the Kids" by Frank Turner
 "Black Boys on Mopeds" by Sinéad O’Connor
 "Sowing the Seeds of Love" by Tears for Fears
 "How Many Lies?" by Spandau Ballet

Roger Waters in 1983 referred to Thatcher sarcastically as "Maggie" multiple times throughout the Pink Floyd album The Final Cut. In the song The Fletcher Memorial Home Waters calls "Maggie" an overgrown infant and an incurable tyrant. At the end of the song he quietly speaks of applying the Final Solution to her and other famous world leaders. A sound recording of Thatcher's voice also appears on Waters' 1987 solo album Radio K.A.O.S. toward the end of the track "Four Minutes", when a portion of her speech to the 1983 Scottish Conservative Party Conference can be heard: "...our own independent nuclear deterrent, which has helped to keep the peace for nearly 40 years." The band Genesis in 1986 utilised a puppet representing her (as well as other politicians) in the music video "Land of Confusion" from the album Invisible Touch.

British indie band Carter the Unstoppable Sex Machine depicted Thatcher on the sleeve of their 1995 single "The Young Offender's Mum".

Thatcher is depicted on the album cover of Death Before Dishonour, a 1987 album by The Exploited, a Scottish punk rock band.

Protest songs

During her political career, Margaret Thatcher was the subject or the inspiration for several protest songs. Paul Weller was a founding member of Red Wedge collective, which unsuccessfully sought to oust Thatcher with the help of music. In 1987, they organised a comedy tour with British comedians Lenny Henry, Ben Elton, Robbie Coltrane, Harry Enfield and others.

Remixes

Less than two months after Thatcher resigned, musical acid house group V.I.M. released a rave track titled "Maggie's Last Party". Described by a music critic in 2011 as "strikingly original, and catchy to the point of irritation", the track was a "fusion" of Thatcher's "uncompromising speeches with a slowly-evolving post-acid house backing"; it reached #68 on the UK Singles Chart in January 1991. The track was a hit with many nightclubs at the time, despite unfavourable opinion of her government among some in the rave community.

Silent disc
In 1983, a vinyl record was pressed entitled "The Wit and Wisdom of Margaret Thatcher", however the whole groove on both sides are totally silent.

Art

Notable works include:
Statue of Margaret Thatcher (1998) – a marble statue installed at Guildhall Art Gallery. The two-ton statue was decapitated in 2002 by a protester.
Statue of Margaret Thatcher (2007) – a bronze statue. The statue has been erected inside the House of Commons. It shows her with her arm outstretched and posed as if addressing the House.
Statue of Margaret Thatcher (2008) - a life sized bronze statue on Hillsdale College's campus, it is the only of her in North America.
Statue of Margaret Thatcher (2022). It was attacked with eggs within two hours. The work, by sculptor Douglas Jennings, was originally intended to stand close to the Houses of Parliament, but it was rejected by Westminster City Council in 2018 when councillors said it was too soon after her death (in 2013) and expressed fears that it would become a focus for "civil disobedience and vandalism".
 Maggie (2009) by Marcus Harvey – a black-and-white portrait composed of over 15,000 casts of sculptural objects including vegetables, dildos, masks and skulls. The work weighs over a ton.
 In the Sleep of Reason by Mark Wallinger – a video piece taken from Thatcher's 1982 Falklands speech and edited to show only each blink, thus giving the appearance that her eyes are constantly shut.

Thatcher was seen as a "gift" by political cartoonists. Among the most memorable images are Gerald Scarfe's provocative "scythe-like" caricatures, some of which were exhibited in his 2005 show "Milk Snatcher, Gerald Scarfe – The Thatcher Drawings".

Video games
Thatcher's Techbase - A mod for Doom II in which the player is tasked with killing a demonic version of Thatcher who has risen from the dead.

Maggie's Club
On Fulham Road in Chelsea, London, there is a 1980s-themed late-night bar dedicated to Thatcher called Maggie's Club.

Football commentary 

Thatcher was one of eight notable Britons cited in Norwegian Bjørge Lillelien's famous "Your boys took a hell of a beating" commentary at the end of England’s shock 2–1 defeat to Norway in September 1981. Beginning his exuberant celebrations with “We are best in the world! We have beaten England! England, birthplace of giants", he ended with, "Maggie Thatcher, can you hear me? Maggie Thatcher ... your boys took a hell of a beating! Your boys took a hell of a beating!"

See also

 "Ding-Dong! The Witch Is Dead", a 1939 song that infamously charted in the week of her death
 "Maggie's Militant Tendency", a controversial programme broadcast by the BBC
 Thatchergate, a hoax perpetrated by members of the anarcho-punk band Crass
 Thatcher effect, an optical illusion first demonstrated on a photograph of Thatcher

References

External links
 
 
 

 
Margaret Thatcher